Peadar Cowan (23 October 1903 – 9 May 1962) was an Irish soldier, solicitor, and politician.

Biography
He was a member of the West Cavan Brigade IRA during the Irish War of Independence. Subsequently, he joined the National Army on 10 February 1922 as a Captain during the Irish Civil War. His rank was reduced to 2nd Lieutenant during the army cut-backs in 1924, following the end of the Civil War. He was promoted to Captain in September 1931 and resigned shortly thereafter. He changed profession and became a solicitor.

In the early 1930s Cowan bounced between radical political factions, becoming a supporter of Eoin O'Duffy's fascistic Blueshirts, before becoming a member of the radical left-wing Irish republican groups Saor Éire in 1931, and the Republican Congress in 1934. However, by the late 1930s, Cowan had switched his political outlook and joined the Labour Party. He first stood unsuccessfully for election at the 1937 general election as a Labour Party candidate for the Meath–Westmeath constituency. He also stood unsuccessfully at the 1938, 1943 and 1944 general elections in the same constituency.

Vanguard Movement

Following the entry of the Soviet Union into World War II, the Communist Party of Ireland in the Republic of Ireland disbanded, with its member instructed to join the Labour Party en masse. This influx of radical communists into the Labour Party lead to intense factionalism that eventually caused a split in the party, with the National Labour Party breaking off in 1944 to distance themselves from the communists. Among this in-fighting and splitting, Cowan broke also broke from the Labour Party to form his own group: In August 1944 Cowan founded a hardline Communist group known as (the) "Vanguard Movement", which led to his expulsion from the Labour Party in 1945. The group advocated the abolition of private property, the ownership by the workers and labourers of the means of production and the assimilation of Ireland into a Federation of Socialist Republics once World War II had ceased. The group also accused the Knights of St Columba of behaving like a secret Catholic society existing with undue control over Irish society. Some names associated with the group included John de Courcy Ireland, RN Tweedy and Frank Edwards. 

The Vanguard's blazen communistic rhetoric quickly made the group a target for the new National Labour Party as well as the Catholic Church. Wth the prospects of growth for the group slim, it was not long before Cowan had moved on from them.

Dáil Éireann
In 1946 he joined the newly formed Clann na Poblachta, where he became the party's first treasurer. He was first elected to Dáil Éireann at the 1948 general election as a Clann na Poblachta Teachta Dála (TD) for the Dublin North-East constituency. He was expelled from the party in July 1948, after he criticised Ireland's receipt of aid from the Marshall Plan negotiated by party leader Seán MacBride as Minister for External Affairs.

During Cowan's time in the Dáil, he was constantly needled by other TDs about his time in the Vanguard, with Seán MacEntee in particular using speaking time in the Dáil to pepper Cowan about his communist statements as Vanguard's leader.

Cowan supported Noël Browne over the Mother and Child Scheme and stood again as an independent candidate at the 1951 general election where he retained his seat. He was defeated at the 1954 general election. 

During Cowan's time as a TD, he continued to work in his capacity as a solicitor. It was during this period that Cowan represented (pro bono) the family of a young Eamon Dunphy who were faced with eviction. Cowan was able to prevent the eviction and Dunphy would later recount the episode in an autobiography.

Imprisonment
In 1956 Cowan declared himself bankrupt. On 1 November 1957 Cowan was convicted of embezzling £3,705 from a bricklayer, James O'Reilly and was sentenced to 2 years of prison. After an appeal to the Supreme Court failed, Cowan was struck off the roll of solicitors by the chief justice on 31 October 1958. Following his release from prison, Cowan would write the book Dungeons Deep, which discussed the state of Ireland's prison system.

Return to politics
In the 1960 local elections Cowan was re-elected to Dublin City Council. The last eliminated candidate, Victor Carton, petitioned that High Court that Cowan was ineligible due to being bankrupted and having been sentenced to two years' hard labour within five years of the election. The petition would have been tried under the Municipal Corporations Act 1882, but in 1961 the High Court struck out the 1882 act as incompatible with the 1937 constitution, so that Cowan kept his seat. Cowan was an unsuccessful candidate at the 1961 general election.

Death
Cowan died on 7 May 1962 in Dublin, leaving an estate valued at £5. Cowan married Rosemary Collumb in 1923, and they had seven sons and four daughters. One of those sons, Rory Cowan, unsuccessfully contested the Dublin North-East constituency for the Labour party in 1965. Rory's son is the actor Rory Cowan.

References

1903 births
1962 deaths
Clann na Poblachta TDs
Independent TDs
Irish communists
Irish solicitors
Irish Republican Army (1919–1922) members
Labour Party (Ireland) politicians
Members of the 13th Dáil
Members of the 14th Dáil
National Army (Ireland) officers
People of the Irish Civil War (Pro-Treaty side)
People of the Irish War of Independence